Neil Pigot (born 28 December 1961) is an Australian actor who is perhaps best known in Australia for his role as Inspector Falcon Price in the highly successful television series Blue Heelers. Pigot has appeared in over 100 episodes of television, a number of feature films and has presented several documentaries on his pet subject Australian military history. A highly regarded and award-winning stage actor, he is also the author of several works of non-fiction.

Early life 
Pigot began life in Melbourne, the eldest son of a butcher turned commercial pilot and his wife who would become one of Australia's pioneering female car sales people. At age 8, his family moved to Darwin and then South East Asia. He completed his schooling in Sydney. Pigot has claimed he was always interested in the Arts but for the first two years after finishing high school he drifted between jobs as a sales clerk, freight clerk, sales canvasser and finally as the manager of a flying school before "falling into acting" at the age of 20.

Career 
Pigot began work with the semi professional Lieder Southern Regional Theatre in Goulburn NSW in the early 1980s first appearing as Meriman the butler in Wilde's The Importance of Being Earnest. He then worked in community theatre and on drama programmes with long term institutionalised adults at Kenmore Psychiatric Hospital before joining Theatre ACT in 1984. After a time as a contract actor in Canberra he established the Black Inc theatre company with Paul Corcoran, Tim Ferguson and Ian Hagan and The Katt Klub, a late night cabaret where he performed with many artists including the Doug Anthony Allstars. His work in theatre has continued and he has played leading roles for all of Australia's major companies including the Melbourne and Sydney Theatre Companies, Belvoir, Playbox/Malthouse, Queensland Theatre Company and State Theatre Company of South Australia and also leading independent companies Brink, Back to Back and Kickhouse most often appearing in new works.

Pigot's television credits include leading guest roles in over twenty television series and several telemovies beginning with GP in the 1980s up until recent appearances in The Kettering Incident for Foxtel. Notable series include The Man from Snowy River, The Games, The Adventures of Lano and Woodley, The Secret Life of Us, Laid, Marshal Law, Wicked Science, Stingers, Miss Fisher's Murder Mysteries, Neighbours, Society Murders and The Doctor Blake Mysteries. For nine years he performed the role of Inspector Falcon Price on the drama series Blue Heelers for which he is best known. Australian films Pigot has been featured in include Head On, Lucky Country, The Condemned, Stepsister from Planet Weird, Red Dog, The Dish, Oranges and Sunshine and Blessed.

Pigot is also a documentary writer and presenter who specialises in Australian military history and has fronted 2 series and three stand alone feature documentaries for Fox History on the subject.

In 1994, he completed his first work of non-fiction The Changi Diary. He also recorded an album The Changi Songbook, a compilation of original songs written by an Australian POW in a Changi POW Camp with the remaining members of the Changi Concert Party in that same year. A live album of the songs, recorded during two concerts at the Melbourne Recital Centre in 2013, is to be released in the future.

Personal life 
Pigot lived and worked in many Australian cities and in the UK before returning to the place of his birth in 1995. In 2001 he married his longtime partner Rachel Mackie, an academic. He has a step daughter, Keone Dodd. The couple divorced in 2016.   He is lifelong collector of stamps and contemporary Australian Art and is an avid cook and gardener which has led to active involvement with both the Slow Food Movement and Gardening Australia.

Filmography

Film

Television

External links
 
 https://www.theage.com.au/entertainment/art-and-design/pigot-returns-in-fine-voice-20030505-gdvngm.html

1961 births
Living people
Australian male television actors
Male actors from Melbourne